Maka dai dai shōgi (摩訶大大将棋 or 摩𩹄大大象戯 'ultra-huge chess') is a large board variant of shogi (Japanese chess).  The game dates back to the 15th century and is based on dai dai shogi and the earlier dai shogi. The three Edo-era sources are not congruent in their descriptions of the pieces not found in smaller games. Apart from its size and number of pieces, the major difference from these smaller games is the "promotion by capture" rule. A more compact modern proposal for the game is called hishigata shogi.

Because of the terse and often incomplete wording of the historical sources for the large shogi variants, except for chu shogi and to a lesser extent dai shogi (which were at some points of time the most prestigious forms of shogi being played), the historical rules of maka dai dai shogi are not clear. Different sources often differ significantly in the moves attributed to the pieces, and the degree of contradiction (summarised below with the listing of most known alternative moves) is such that it is likely impossible to reconstruct the "true historical rules" with any degree of certainty, if there ever was such a thing. It is not clear if the game was ever played much historically, as the few sets that were made seem to have been intended only for display.

Rules of the game

Objective 

The objective is to capture the opponent's king or emperor.  If a prince is in play, it too must be captured.  Unlike standard shogi, pieces may not be dropped back into play after being captured.

Game equipment 

Two players, Black and White (or sente and gote), play on a board composed of squares in a grid of 19 ranks (rows) by 19 files (columns) with a total of 361 squares.  The squares are undifferentiated by marking or color.

Each player has a set of 96 wedge-shaped pieces of 50 different types.  In all, the players must remember 74 different moves.  The pieces are of slightly different sizes, from largest to smallest (or roughly most to least powerful) they are:

 1 King
 1 Hook mover
 1 Capricorn
 1 Queen
 2 Dragon kings
 2 Dragon horses
 2 Rooks
 2 Bishops
 2 Side fliers
 1 Lion
 1 Lion dog
 1 She-devil
 1 Wrestler
 1 Guardian of the Gods
 1 Buddhist devil
 2 Violent oxen
 2 Flying dragons

 2 Old rats
 1 Right chariot
 1 Left chariot
 2 Vertical movers
 2 Side movers
 1 Phoenix
 1 Kirin
 2 Donkeys
 2 Knights
 1 Drunken elephant
 2 Blind tigers
 2 Ferocious leopards
 1 Reclining dragon
 2 Gold generals
 2 Silver generals
 2 Copper generals
 2 Tile generals

 2 Evil Wolves
 2 Iron generals
 2 Stone generals
 2 Reverse chariots
 2 Lances
 2 Earth generals
 2 Go betweens
 2 Blind bears
 1 Chinese cock
 1 Old monkey
 2 Angry boars
 2 Cat swords
 1 Coiled serpent
 1 Dark spirit
 1 Deva
 19 Pawns

Many of the English-language names are chosen to correspond to their rough equivalents in Western chess, not necessarily as translations of the Japanese names. (Sometimes the queen is called the "free king", a direct translation of its Japanese name. The kirin's name is sometimes anglicised as kylin.)

Each piece has its name in the form of two Japanese characters marked on its face. On the reverse side of some pieces are one or two other characters, often in a different color (e.g., red instead of black); this reverse side is used to indicate that the piece has been promoted during play. The pieces of the two sides do not differ in color, but instead each piece is shaped like a wedge, and faces forward, toward the opposing side. This shows who controls the piece during play.

Table of pieces

Listed below are the pieces of the game and, if they promote, which pieces they promote to. Of the 50 kinds of pieces, 21 promote to gold, 26 promote to new pieces (though some move like starting pieces, e.g. the free cat moves like a bishop, the free earth & goer like a reverse chariot); and 3 do not promote (queen, dragon king, and dragon horse). The new pieces are marked with an asterisk (*).

† The second character in 'wizard stork' is not present in most fonts: it should be 而 atop 鷦.

The queen could also be abbreviated FK (for free king) and the kirin as Ky (for kylin).

Setup 

Below is a diagram showing the setup of one player's pieces.  The way one player sees their own pieces is the same way the opposing player will see their pieces.

The Shōgi rokushu no zushiki gives the following mnemonic poem to aid in the memorization of the initial setup:

 立馬略頌
 玉醉獅犬奔王歩 提虎騏力摩羯歩
 金豹悪羅龍王歩 銀蛇飛龍龍馬歩
 銅将盲熊角歩仲 鐵鶏猛牛竪行歩
 瓦将嗔猪横飛歩 石猫桂馬横行歩
 土将老鼠左車歩 香反驢馬飛車歩
 歩兵左右不レ替者 走馬與レ利立レ于レ端
 釣行龍々角竪行 横飛横行右飛車
 金夜飛龍牛桂驢 鳳悪盲熊嗔老鼠
 虎豹臥龍猿猫反 無明金銀銅鐵将
 瓦将石将土将香 南方相違對揚馬
 提婆無明與レ王副 麒麟鳳皇獅子脇
 金剛力士犬左右 釣行摩羯龍王内
 羅刹夜叉龍王下 臥龍蟠蛇銀将上
 古猿淮鶏鐵将上 左右両車飛車内

Game play 

The players alternate making a move, with Black moving first. (The traditional terms 'black' and 'white' are used to differentiate the sides during discussion of the game, though the pieces are all the same color.)  A move consists of moving a piece on the board and potentially promoting the piece.  Each of these options is detailed below.

Movement and capture 

Most pieces in the game move in a unique manner.

Step movers 
The kings, drunken elephants, blind tigers, ferocious leopards, reclining dragons, Chinese cocks, old monkeys, evil wolves, generals, angry boars, cat swords, coiled serpents, dark spirits, Devas, go betweens and pawns only move one square at a time. If an opponent's piece occupies a square that is a possible destination for the moving piece, the opponent's piece may be captured by placing the moving piece on that square, and removing the opponent's piece from the board. If a friendly piece (that is, a piece controlled by the same player) occupies the square, the moving piece may not move in that direction.

Limited ranging pieces 
The she-devil, wrestler, guardian of the Gods, Buddhist devil, violent ox, flying dragon and old rat can move along a limited number of free squares in certain directions.

Jumping pieces 
The emperor, lion, lion dog, furious fiend, teaching king, Buddhist spirit, kirin, phoenix, donkey and knight jump, that is, they can move over any intervening piece, whether friend or foe.

Ranging pieces 
The queen, dragon king, dragon horse, chariots, rook, bishop, side flier, movers and lance can move any number of squares along a straight line, limited by the edge of the board. If an opponent's piece intervenes, it may be captured by moving to that square, and removing it from the board. If a friendly piece intervenes, the moving piece is limited to a distance that stops short of the intervening piece; if the friendly piece is adjacent, it cannot move in that direction at all.

Hook moves (changing tack) 
The hook mover and Capricorn can move any number of squares along a straight line, then any number of squares along a perpendicular straight line limited by the edge of the board. If an opponent's piece intervenes, it may be captured by moving to that square, and removing it from the board. If a friendly piece intervenes, the moving piece is limited to a distance that stops short of the intervening piece; if the friendly piece is adjacent, it cannot move in that direction at all.  Although they have the ability to move in two directions in one move, they are not required to.

Lion moves (multiple captures)

The lion, lion dog, furious fiend, teaching king, and Buddhist spirit have sequential multiple-capture abilities, called "lion moves". The details of these powerful moves are described for the lion and lion dog, below.

Promotion 
According to The Chess Variant Pages, pieces that can promote can choose whether or not they will promote when they capture an unpromoted enemy piece; however, if a piece captures a promoted piece, it must promote if able.

TSA and Japanese Wikipedia suggest instead that promotion is compulsory on any capture, but this seems unlikely; many of the most powerful pieces cannot be obtained through promotion, but many very powerful pieces "promote" to a far weaker gold general, so compulsory promotion on any capture would quickly degenerate the armies into seas of golds.

Promotion is indicated by turning the piece over after it moves, revealing the character for the promoted piece. There are no promotion zones; dots on the board that usually represent promotion zones are present after the sixth rank only as a placement guide for initial setup.

Promoting a piece has the effect of changing how that piece moves.

Pieces which are already promoted cannot promote again, except as follows:

Any piece, promoted or not, that captures a Deva or teaching king (a promoted Deva) promotes to a teaching king. This is effected by replacing it on the board with the captured piece. Similarly, any piece that captures a dark spirit or Buddhist spirit (a promoted dark spirit) promotes to a Buddhist spirit. This is sometimes expressed as the piece being contagious: when something captures a contagious piece type, it becomes that piece type. The only exception is (potentially) royal pieces (emperors, kings, princes, and drunk elephants) which promote to their normal promoted forms, or stay as they are if already promoted.

It is not clear what happens if a multi-capturing piece such as a lion or a lion dog captures two different contagious piece types in one turn, e.g. a lion capturing both a teaching king and a Buddhist spirit on the same turn. Although the situation is very unlikely to arise, an official of the Japanese Chu Shogi Association has suggested in discussion with H. G. Muller (who programmed an engine HaChu for chu shogi and wrote the descriptions for some large shogi variants for The Chess Variant Pages) that the multi-capturing piece would promote to the last piece captured. In the case of a lion dog capturing two pieces on the same orthogonal or diagonal, it would not be permitted to jump over the first piece, capture the second, and then move back to capture the first.

Otherwise, pieces don't promote more than once: they only have two sides.

Pieces on the 4th, 5th, and 6th ranks which promote, as well as the outside pieces of the 1st and 2nd ranks, promote (or perhaps demote) to Gold. Twelve of the pieces in the first and second ranks, as well as the go-between, become "free" when promoted, meaning that they move in the same directions as in their unpromoted state, but are free to move an unlimited number of squares in those directions. The remaining pieces gain entirely new powers when promoted.

Miscellaneous info 
The pawn, lance, stone general, iron general, and knight can only move forward. Therefore, if one reaches the furthest rank (or the penultimate rank in the case of the knight), it is unable to move further, it must remain there until captured.

Pieces move either orthogonally (that is, forward, backward, or to the side, in the direction of one of the arms of a plus sign, +), or diagonally (in the direction of one of the arms of a multiplication sign, ×). The lion, knight, and furious fiend are exceptions.

Individual pieces
In the diagrams below, the different types of moves are coded by symbol and by color: Blue for step moves, yellow for jumps, green for multiple capture, and pink for range moves, as follows: 

Piece names with a grey background are present at the start of the game; those with a blue background only appear with promotion. Betza's funny notation has been included in brackets for easier reference, with the extension that the notation xxxayyyK stands for an xxxK move possibly followed by an yyyK move, not necessarily in the same direction. By default continuation legs can go into all directions, but can be restricted to a single line by a modifier 'v' ("vertical", interpreted relative to the piece's current position on its path). The default modality of all legs is the ability to move and capture: other possibilities are specified explicitly. U denotes the universal leaper, a piece which can jump to any square on the board except the one that it is on.

There are many divergent descriptions in the Edo-era sources; the rules from The Chess Variant Pages are followed below, with the exception of the donkey (where all three Edo-era sources agree on a different move). Some divergent moves are detailed in the footnotes.

Repetition 
A player may not make a move if the resulting position is one that has previously occurred in the game with the same player to move. This is called repetition (千日手 sennichite). Note that certain pieces have the ability to pass in certain situations (lions, lion dogs, furious fiends, teaching kings, and Buddhist spirits). Such a pass move leaves the position unchanged, but it does not violate the repetition rule, as it will now be the turn of the other player to move. Of course, two consecutive passes are not possible, as the first player will see the same position as before.

However, evidence from chu shogi problems suggests that this at least does not apply to a player who is in check or whose pieces are attacked, as otherwise one could win via perpetual check or perpetual pursuit. The modern chu shogi rule as applied by the Japanese Chu Shogi Association (JCSA) is as follows, and presumably maka dai dai shogi should be similar. If one side is making attacks on other pieces (however futile) with his moves in the repeat cycle, and the other is not, the attacking side must deviate, while in case of checking the checker must deviate regardless of whether the checked side attacks other pieces. In the case of consecutive passes, the side passing first must deviate, making turn passing to avoid zugzwang pointless if the opponent is in a position where he can pass his turn too. Only the fourth repetition is forbidden by these rules. If none of these are applicable, repetition is a draw.

Check and mate 

When a player makes a move such that the opponent's king, emperor or prince (sole one in play) could be captured on the following move, the move is said to give check to the king, emperor or prince; the king, emperor or prince is said to be in check. If a player's king, emperor or prince is in check and no legal move by that player will get the king, emperor or prince out of check, the checking move is also a mate, and effectively wins the game.  If a player has both a king (or emperor) and prince in play, then the player need not move only one out of check.

Recall that an emperor cannot capture a protected piece, even if that protected piece is the opponent's last royal. (Here "protected" means that the opponent could recapture if we ignore that he has just lost his last royal.) Since an emperor protects all pieces on his side, if both armies have emperors, then the emperors can only capture each other, and even that only if the other emperor is unprotected.

Game end 

A player who captures the opponent's king (or emperor, which is a promoted king) or prince (when the other is already gone) wins the game. In practice this rarely happens; a player will resign when loss is inevitable and the king (emperor) or prince will be taken on the opponent's next move (as in International Chess) because of the tradition that it is seen as an embarrassment to lose.

A player who makes an illegal move loses immediately. (This rule may be relaxed in casual games.)

Game notation 
The method used in English-language texts to express shogi moves was established by George Hodges in 1976. It is derived from the algebraic notation used for chess, but differs in several respects.  Modifications have been made for maka dai dai shogi.

A typical example is P-8g.
The first letter represents the piece moved (see above).
Promoted pieces have a + added in front of the letter. (e.g., +OM for a mountain witch (promoted old monkey).  The designation of the piece is followed by a symbol indicating the type of move: - for an ordinary move or x for a capture.  Next is the designation for the square on which the piece lands.  This consists of a number representing the file and a lowercase letter representing the rank, with 1a being the top right corner (as seen from Black's point of view) and 19s being the bottom left corner.  (This method of designating squares is based on Japanese convention, which, however, uses Japanese numerals instead of letters. For example, the square 2c is denoted by 2三 in Japanese.)

If a lion captures by 'igūi’, the square of the piece being captured is used instead of the destination square, and this is preceded by the symbol '!'.  If a double or triple capture is made, then it is added after the first capture.

If a move entitles the player to promote the piece, then a + is added to the end to signify that the promotion was taken, or an = to indicate that it was declined.  For example, CSx7c= indicates a cat sword capturing on 7c without promoting.

In cases where the above notation would be ambiguous, the designation of the start square is added after the designation for the piece in order to make clear which piece is meant.

Moves are commonly numbered as in chess.

Hishigata shogi

Sean Humby created a variant of maka dai dai shogi called Hishigata shogi. It was motivated by criticisms that maka dai dai takes a very long time to finish, and that the more interesting pieces have little opportunity for play. The only difference is in the setup, which places the opposing pieces close together and leaves the armies' rear flanks exposed, though Humby recommends that the teaching king be played as the weaker Western variant (as a queen), probably referring to the single alternative offered by Sean Evans' ShogiVar software, which is Queen plus 3-step King with full lion power, no longer believed to be the correct move by anyone.

Setup
In the hishigata setup, only one rank is left empty between the opposing armies. This is indicated with a darker shading in the diagram below.

Maka dai shogi
There are some minor attempts to revive maka dai dai shogi in Japan, with a few rule changes. This revived form of the game is called maka dai shogi. The SZ and SSZ description of the furious fiend (lion + lion dog) is followed. The kirin and phoenix promote to the lion and queen, as in chu shogi. Promotion becomes mandatory on capture, but capturing a Deva or dark spirit does not result in promotion to teaching king or Buddhist spirit respectively. Only capturing the promoted forms of these pieces has that result. The blind bear's move is changed to FsW (one square in any direction but directly forward or backward), making it consistent with the free bear (which moves as shown here with no forward diagonal jump). The "free" pieces resulting from promotion have been changed to "ski-sliders" (skipping the first two squares before sliding, similar to the picket in Tamerlane chess), and many of the limited-range pieces have been changed to cannon-like hoppers that jump to the furthest square in their range, capturing any enemy pieces they leap over. The donkey loses its vertical stepping move and the knight has become a forward-only alfil. Many other minor changes are present: for example, the angry boar is now frlW and the old rat is fWbF.

Strategy

Piece values
According to the German Chu Shogi Association, the average values of the pieces are (using the interpretations of The Shogi Association, e.g. the lion dog as only a three-square range mover with no lion power):

These average values do not take into account the special status of the king or prince as royal pieces, or the emperor as a disposable piece if other royals are present. They have also been normalized so that the pawn is worth 1 point to avoid fractions. Additionally, pieces change value if they have a good chance of promotion. This is particularly significant for the hook mover and capricorn, which are the two most powerful pieces in the game, but "promote" to the weak gold general.

Notes on pieces with conflicting descriptions
These descriptions are taken from Japanese Wikipedia, which references the Edo-era publications 象戯図式 Shōgi Zushiki (SZ), 諸象戯図式 Sho Shōgi Zushiki (SSZ), and 象棋六種之図式 Shōgi Rokushu no Zushiki (SRZ). The first two are generally though not always in agreement, but the third differs in the case of most pieces which are not found in smaller shogi variants.

Notes

References

See also 
 Shogi variant
 Wa shogi
 Chu shogi
 Heian dai shogi
 Dai shogi
 Tenjiku shogi
 Dai dai shogi
 Tai shogi
 Taikyoku shogi

External links 
 Maka Dai Dai Shogi at The Chess Variant Pages
 Shogi Net
 history.chess/Maka dai dai shogi
 YouTube Maka Dai Dai Shogi Video
 Hishigata shogi
 Maka Dai Shogi: a modernised version of maka dai dai shogi

Shogi variants